Kärkinen is a Finnish surname. Notable people with the surname include:

Juhani Kärkinen (born 1935), Finnish ski jumper 
Kaija Kärkinen (born 1962), Finnish singer and actress
Kalevi Kärkinen (1934–2004), Finnish ski jumper, brother of Juhani

Finnish-language surnames